Gilles Julien Hamel (born March 18, 1960) is a Canadian former professional ice hockey right wing. He was drafted in the fourth round, 74th overall, by the Buffalo Sabres in the 1979 NHL Entry Draft. Gilles is the brother of Jean Hamel.

Biography
Hamel was born in Asbestos, Quebec. As a youth, he played in the 1972 and 1973 Quebec International Pee-Wee Hockey Tournaments with a minor ice hockey team from Asbestos. He played three seasons of junior hockey in the Quebec Major Junior Hockey League. Hamel made his professional debut with the Sabres' American Hockey League affiliate, the Rochester Americans, in the 1980 Calder Cup playoffs. After six seasons in the National Hockey League with Buffalo, during which he scored 92 goals, he was traded to the Winnipeg Jets in exchange for Scott Arniel after the 1985–86 season.

Hamel had the most prolific goal-scoring season of his NHL career in 1986–87 with Winnipeg, notching 27 goals. After a mediocre 1987–88, however, and spending much of the early 1988–89 season in the AHL, Hamel was traded to the Los Angeles Kings in exchange for Paul Fenton. He played just eleven games with the Kings during that season, and spent the final year of his career playing in France.

In his NHL career, Hamel appeared in 519 games.  He scored 127 goals and added 147 assists. He also played in 27 NHL playoff games, scoring four goals and five assists.

Career statistics

Regular season and playoffs

References

External links
 

1960 births
Living people
Buffalo Sabres draft picks
Buffalo Sabres players
Canadian ice hockey right wingers
Chicoutimi Saguenéens (QMJHL) players
Drakkars de Caen players
Ice hockey people from Quebec
Laval National players
Los Angeles Kings players
Moncton Hawks players
New Haven Nighthawks players
People from Val-des-Sources
Rochester Americans players
Trois-Rivières Draveurs players
Winnipeg Jets (1979–1996) players